J.U.I.C.E. (abbreviation for Just Understand I Control Everything) is the debut extended play (EP) by American hip hop recording artist Roscoe Dash. It was released on December 20, 2011, by M.M.I. (Making Moves Incorporated), Music Line Entertainment,  Geffen Records and Interscope Records.

The album debuted at number 180 on the Billboard 200, with first-week sales of 9,500 copies in the United States. In its second week, the EP has rose to 130.

Singles 
The EP's official lead single is titled "Good Good Night", and was produced by Kane Beatz. The song was officially released to the iTunes Store on October 4, 2011.

Track listing

Charts

References

External links 
 

2011 debut EPs
Roscoe Dash albums
Albums produced by Kane Beatz
Albums produced by Nard & B
Albums produced by Sonny Digital